Walensky is a surname. Notable people with the surname include:

 Lisa Walensky, Philly (TV series) character
 Loren D. Walensky, American physician-scientist
 Rochelle Walensky (born 1969), American physician-scientist
 Steve Walensky, Cassville, Missouri mayor

Surnames of Polish origin